El Ratón (Spanish for "The Mouse") or Ratón may refer to:

People
As a nickname:
 Hell Raton (born 1990), formerly El Raton, Italian rapper with Ecuadorian origins
Roberto Ayala (born 1973), Argentine footballer
 Raúl Macías (1934–2009), Mexican boxer and actor
 Ramón Rodríguez (footballer) (born 1977), Peruvian footballer
 Ovidio Guzmán López (born 1990), Sinaloa Cartel member and son of Joaquín "El Chapo" Guzmán

Other uses
 Ratón, "el terrible Ratón," a Spanish bull which has killed three bullfighters since 2001
 El Ratón (film), a 1957 Mexican film
  El Raton (song), a song by Cheo Feliciano on the album, A man and His music, 2009

See also
 Raton (disambiguation)
 Ratoncito Pérez, "El Ratón de los Dientes" - the tooth fairy